Majic Window is a home improvement company based in Wixom, Michigan, United States, They claim to be the world's largest distributor of fibreglass windows.

History
Majic Window is a family-owned corporation that was established by Bart Rue and Rod Rue in 1997 in Wixom, Michigan. The company introduced fibreglass windows to its product line in 2001. To promote the brand, retired anchorman Mort Crim was hired as the spokesperson in 2005. Two years later, the corporate headquarters of Majic Window were relocated to Wixom, Michigan.

References

Home improvement
Companies based in Michigan